Abra J. Powers (November 24, 1883 – August 12, 1971) was an American lawyer and politician.

Powers was born in Granite Falls, Minnesota. He received his law degree from University of Minnesota Law School in 1911. Powers lived in Mahnomen, Minnesota with his wife and family. He served in the Minnesota House of Representatives from 1931 to 1946 and was an Independent.

References

1883 births
1971 deaths
People from Granite Falls, Minnesota
People from Mahnomen County, Minnesota
University of Minnesota Law School alumni
Minnesota lawyers
Minnesota Independents
Members of the Minnesota House of Representatives